George Edward Henry Arthur Herbert, 2nd Earl of Powis (7 July 1755 – 16 January 1801), styled Viscount Ludlow until 1772, was an British peer.

Early life
Herbert was born at Finchley, Middlesex, the son of Henry Herbert, 1st Earl of Powis, by Barbara Herbert, daughter of Lord Edward Herbert. He was educated at Eton College.

Career
He succeeded his father in the earldom in 1772 and was appointed Recorder of Ludlow and Lord Lieutenant of Montgomeryshire in 1776. Also in 1776 he served as treasurer of the Salop Infirmary in Shrewsbury. Powis was commissioned a colonel to embody the Montgomeryshire Militia in 1778. In 1798 he was also made Lord Lieutenant of Shropshire; he was also appointed colonel of the Shropshire Militia in place of the Montgomeryshire. He retained both Lord-Lieutenancies until his death in 1801.
 
Lord Powis made a Grand Tour in Italy in 1775–76, when he probably acquired a collection of marble sculpture preserved at his family seat, Powis Castle.  He added a ballroom but did little to maintain the house, visitor John Byng in 1784 ascribing its neglected state to his time spent "in the prodigalities of London and in driving high phaetons up St James's Street."  At a later visit (1793) he wrote: "The present (grandly-descended peer) is a mean silly man, the bubble of his mistress (and of his steward consequently) who rarely comes here, to sneak for about a day or two."

Personal life
Lord Powis died at the York House Hotel, Albemarle Street, London in January 1801, aged 45, and was buried at St Mary's Church, Welshpool. He was unmarried and the titles died with him. His sister and heir, Lady Henrietta, married Edward Clive, 2nd Baron Clive, who was created Earl of Powis in 1804.

References

1755 births
1801 deaths
People educated at Eton College
Alumni of St John's College, Cambridge
Earls of Powis
Lord-Lieutenants of Montgomeryshire
Lord-Lieutenants of Shropshire
George